Alto Zambeze is a municipality in the Moxico province of Angola. It is situated near the Zambian border, with a population of 110,900 (2014 census) and a total area of 53,000 km2. The municipality's seat is the town of Cazombo, on the Zambezi river.

References

Populated places in Moxico Province
Municipalities of Angola